Joyce Mvula (born 15 April 1994) is a Malawian netball player. She was selected to represent the Malawi netball team at the 2019 Netball World Cup. She played in the Netball Superleague with Manchester Thunder for 6 years from 2017 until 2022 after which she announced she would be leaving to play in another country. 

After helping Manchester Thunder win the 2022 Netball Superleague title, Mvula announced that she was leaving the club. She subsequently signed for Central Pulse ahead of the 2023 ANZ Premiership season.

References

External links
 

1994 births
Living people
Malawian netball players
Place of birth missing (living people)
2019 Netball World Cup players
Netball Superleague players
Manchester Thunder players
Malawian expatriate sportspeople in England
2011 World Netball Championships players
2015 Netball World Cup players